Henningsville is an unincorporated community in Longswamp Township in Berks County, Pennsylvania, United States. Henningsville is located at the intersection of Woodside Avenue and Centennial Road.

References

Unincorporated communities in Berks County, Pennsylvania
Unincorporated communities in Pennsylvania